Assisi Nagar is a neighbourhood of Chennai, India. It is in Korattur, near Madhavaram. It is surrounded by a green area and has 10 streets with about 500 families.

History 
The name Assisi came from Late Rev Father Assisi.  Assisi Nagar was a place for sri lankan refuges, later it was changed to residential area.  Assisi Nagar is surrounded by many greeneries, which gives nourishment to the nature.

Hospitals  

Government Hospital, Palpannai
KM Hospital

Landmarks 
 
 St. Judes Church, Assisi Nagar 
Park, Assisi Nagar
Milk Colony Playground
Botanical Garden

Education

Schools 
 St. Joseph matriculation Higher Secondary School
 Vidya Mandir matriculation School
 Don Bosco matriculation higher secondary school
 Viuksha Vidhyashram School

Colleges 
Jayagovind Harigopal Agarwal Agarsen College
 Sebastian ITI
 Thiruthangal nadar college
 Nallalaghu polytechnic college
 Tamil Nadu Veterinary University

References

Cities and towns in Tiruvallur district
Neighbourhoods in Chennai
Suburbs of Chennai